Judit Varga (born 16 April 1976) is a Hungarian middle-distance runner who specialized in the 1500 metres, since 2009 has been naturalized Italian.

Personal bests
For Hungary
800 metres - 1:59.46 (2003)
1500 metres - 4:01.26 (2002)

For Italy
800 metres - 2:00.91 (2009)
1500 metres - 4:05.60 (2009)

Achievements

See also
Italian all-time top lists - 800 m
Italian all-time top lists - 1500 m

References

External links
 

1976 births
Living people
Hungarian female middle-distance runners
Italian female middle-distance runners
Olympic athletes of Hungary
Athletes (track and field) at the 2004 Summer Olympics
World Athletics Championships athletes for Hungary
Naturalised citizens of Italy